Bob Faehn (April 2, 1958 – September 13, 2021) was an American politician who served in the South Dakota House of Representatives from the 5th district from 2005 to 2011.

He died of cancer on September 13, 2021, in Watertown, South Dakota, at age 63.

References

1958 births
2021 deaths
Republican Party members of the South Dakota House of Representatives
People from Minneapolis
Deaths from cancer in South Dakota